is a Japanese football player.

Playing career
Okamoto was born in Toyama Prefecture on April 7, 2000. He joined J2 League club Albirex Niigata from youth team in 2018.

References

External links

Living people
Association football people from Toyama Prefecture
Japanese footballers
J2 League players
Albirex Niigata players
Association football defenders
2000 births